Deep Pal (16 April 1953 – 7 October 2021) was an Indian cinematographer.  He was the son of publicist Colin Pal and grandson of director Niranjan Pal. He started his career with Basu Bhattacharya doing camerawork for Avishkaar, before moving on to an independent career as a documentary filmmaker. Pal is known as being one of the pioneers of Steadicam camerawork in India. Pal's first major Steadicam work was in Shiva, which was considered a pathbreaking film on visual technique in Telugu cinema. His later work included Bandit Queen directed by Shekhar Kapur and Dil Se.. directed by Mani Ratnam. He died of cancer on 7 October 2021.

Filmography

As a cinematographer
While his primary recognition was for his work in bringing image-stabilizing technology to camerawork in India, prior to a Steadicam, he cinematographed and directed his own documentary films including Cages (1984) on prostitution in Falkland Road in Mumbai, and Give us this Day our Daily Lunch (1985) based on the Dabbawala food delivery system in Bombay.

In 1993, he was Director of Photography (DOP) in the Hindi Feature Film Pehla Nasha, the first directorial venture of filmmaker Ashutosh Gowariker.

As a steadicam operator

References

External links
 
 

1953 births
2021 deaths
Indian documentary filmmakers
Film directors from Mumbai
Hindi film cinematographers
Cinematographers from Maharashtra